Six Feet Four is a 1919 American silent Western film directed by Henry King and starring William Russell, Vola Vale, and Charles K. French.

Cast

References

Bibliography
 Donald W. McCaffrey & Christopher P. Jacobs. Guide to the Silent Years of American Cinema. Greenwood Publishing, 1999.

External links
 

1919 films
1919 Western (genre) films
Films directed by Henry King
1910s English-language films
Pathé Exchange films
American black-and-white films
Silent American Western (genre) films
1910s American films